Kohjinsha was a Japanese PC manufacturer best known outside Japan for their current SA1F00 UMPC. In November 2006, the company announced KOHJINSHA SA, a series of lightweight computers of simple configuration, that come with a high specification for the price, attracting the attention of enthusiast market. According to market information firm BCN, it was the market leader in Japan for computers with screens smaller than 11 inches.

External links

Defunct computer hardware companies
Ultra Mobile PC